Scinax tsachila is a frog in the family Hylidae.  It is endemic to Ecuador and probably also lives in Peru and Colombia.  Scientists have seen from sea level to 1207 meters above sea level.  It lives on the Pacific side of the contienent.

Appearance

The adult male frog measures 27.2 to 34.2 mm in snout-vent length and the adult female frog 33.2 to 36.4 mm. This frog is medium-brown in color. Some individuals have stripes down their sides some do not.

Home

This frog lives in partially or fully open areas, including secondary forest and piedmont forest. No individual was found in primary forest. Because scientists have seen this frog in artificially open areas, they do not think its numbers will decline as deforestation continues.

The male frog chooses a site near a pond, lake, or other body of water. He sits on the ground or perches on low vegetation and sings for the female.

Etymology

This frog is named after the Tsáchila indigenous people, who live nearby.

References

Amphibians of South America
tsachila
Amphibians described in 2018